The following highways are numbered 499:

Ireland
  R499 road

Japan
  Japan National Route 499

United Kingdom
  A499 road

United States
  Louisiana Highway 499
  Kentucky Route 499
  Maryland Route 499 (former)
  Texas State Highway Loop 499
  Farm to Market Road 499